ISO 3166-2:MY is the entry for Malaysia in ISO 3166-2, part of the ISO 3166 standard published by the International Organization for Standardization (ISO), which defines codes for the names of the principal subdivisions (e.g., provinces or states) of all countries coded in ISO 3166-1.

Currently for Malaysia, ISO 3166-2 codes are defined for three federal territories and 13 states.

Each code consists of two parts, separated by a hyphen. The second part is two digits:

 01–13: states
 14–16: federal territories

Current codes
Subdivision names are listed as in the ISO 3166-2 standard published by the ISO 3166 Maintenance Agency (ISO 3166/MA).

Click on the button in the header to sort each column.

Changes
The following changes to the entry have been announced in newsletters by the ISO 3166/MA since the first publication of ISO 3166-2 in 1998:

Codes changed in Newsletter I-5
The letters in the former codes are currently used in vehicle registration plates, except Sabah and Sarawak which use S and Q respectively.

See also
 Subdivisions of Malaysia
 FIPS region codes of Malaysia

External links
 ISO Online Browsing Platform: MY
 States of Malaysia, Statoids.com

2:MY
ISO 3166-2
Malaysia geography-related lists